Koshgak (also Romanized as Koshkak) is a village in Pain Velayat Rural District, in the Central District of Taybad County, Razavi Khorasan Province, Iran. At the 2006 census, its population was 576, in 131 families.

References 

Populated places in Taybad County